Saint-André is the fifth-largest commune in the French overseas department of Réunion. It is located on the northeast part of the island of Réunion. The small lake Étang de Bois Rouge is located in the commune. 

This area between the Saint-Jean and the Mât rivers was populated from the middle of the 17th century. Indeed, the first exiles were confined to Bourbon in 1646 by Mr. Promis, governor of the French Comptoir of Fort-Dauphin, to curb their mutinous ardor. Disembarked from the Saint-Laurent, they were settled in the Quartier des Français, on the banks of the Saint-Jean River. The region of Saint-André has historically seen the landing of the first French.

Geography

Climate

Saint-André has a tropical monsoon climate (Köppen climate classification Am).

Population

Malaysia Airlines Flight 370 debris 

Education 
 Epitech

See also
Communes of the Réunion department

References

Communes of Réunion